Convent Glen is an under construction rail station on the Confederation Line in Ottawa, Ontario. It will be located in the median of Highway 174 below Orléans Boulevard. It is being constructed as part of the Stage 2 O-Train expansion and is scheduled for completion in 2025. The station will consist of an island platform and will have two entrances; one on each side of Orléans Boulevard. Bus connections will be available at each entrance.

References

Confederation Line stations
Railway stations scheduled to open in 2025